The 1990 San Miguel Beermen season was the 16th season of the franchise in the Philippine Basketball Association (PBA).

Draft picks

Notable dates
February 22: The Grandslam champions San Miguel Beermen scored their second win without a loss by turning back Pop Cola, 113-108.  

July 26: Ato Agustin wriggled his way in for a twinner with nine seconds left, lifting the Beermen to a 125-123 victory over Presto as the Tivolis absorbed their second straight loss in the semifinals of the All-Filipino Conference after sweeping the eliminations with 10 straight victories.

August 7: The Beermen clinch the win-five incentive and a playoff for one of the two finals berth by winning over Presto Tivoli, 110-109, on Alvin Teng's two free throws with no time left. 

November 6: The Beermen outclassed Shell Rimula-X, 148-132, to close out their stint in the third conference with four wins against six losses, winning their last three matches. Their victory was rendered meaningless when the Sarsi Sizzlers triumph over Purefoods earlier in the first game. San Miguel will have their worst finish as they failed to advance into the next round for the first time since the 1986 Third Conference when the ballclub return to the league after a two-conference leave.

Occurrences
San Miguel played without four key men in their first three outings in the third conference. Ramon Fernandez, Samboy Lim, Hector Calma and Yves Dignadice, along with coach Norman Black, were all part of the PBA-backed National team in the Beijing Asian Games. The Beermen did welcome the return of Ricardo Brown from the lineup but he only saw action in their first game, a 147-149 loss to Añejo Rum on October 2.

Roster

Recruited imports

References

San Miguel Beermen seasons
San